Dunnville is an unincorporated community located in the town of Dunn, Dunn County, Wisconsin, United States.

References

Further reading 
 

Unincorporated communities in Dunn County, Wisconsin
Unincorporated communities in Wisconsin